The Green Animalist Party (acronym PVA) is a Uruguayan conservative green party established in 2018, which places a particular emphasis on animal rights.

On 30 June 2019, its candidates took part in the primary elections and gained the right to participate in the October general election. Their presidential candidate will be Gustavo Salle, together with Enrique Viana.

Electoral history

Presidential elections

Chamber of Deputies and Senate elections

References 

Green political parties in Uruguay
2018 establishments in Uruguay
Animal advocacy parties
Political parties established in 2018
Environment of Uruguay